Rising sun may refer to sunrise.  

Rising Sun or The Rising Sun may also refer to:

Books
 Rising Sun (Crichton novel), a 1992 Michael Crichton novel
 The Rising Sun, Pulitzer Prize winning account by John Toland
 Rising Sun (Conroy novel), a 2012 alternate history war novel by Robert Conroy

Film and television
 Rising Sun (film), a 1993 film based on the Michael Crichton novel
 Rising Sun, version of Toonami, a former action cartoon block on Cartoon Network
 Rising Sun Films, an Indian production company based in Mumbai
 Rising Sun Pictures, an Australian visual effects company

Games
 Rising Sun (board game), a miniature wargame
 Rising Sun (video game), a World War II computer wargame by TalonSoft
 Medal of Honor: Rising Sun, a 2003 World War II video game by EA Games

Music
 Rising Sun Rock Festival, an annual festival in Otaru, Japan

Albums
 Rising Sun (Aly & Fila album) (2010)
 Rising Sun (Augustus Pablo album) (1986)
 Rising Sun (Stray from the Path album) (2011)
 Rising Sun (TVXQ album) (2005)

Songs
"Rising Sun", charting single for Medicine Head Number 11 – 1973
 "Rising Sun" (Fats Domino song)
 "Rising Sun", a song from the album Brainwashed by George Harrison
 "Rising Sun", a song from the album East by Cold Chisel

Places

United States
 Rising Sun, Delaware
 Rising Sun, Pope County, Illinois, an unincorporated community
 Rising Sun, White County, Illinois, an unincorporated community
 Rising Sun, Indiana, a city
 Rising Sun, Maryland, a town
 Rising Sun, Mississippi, an unincorporated community
 Rising Sun (Montana), a wayside area
 Rising Sun, Wisconsin, an unincorporated community
 Rising Sun Auto Camp, Glacier National Park, Montana, on the National Register of Historic Places

United Kingdom
 Rising Sun, Cornwall, a hamlet

Pubs

Australia
 The Rising Sun, historic pub in Kensington, Adelaide, South Australia
 Rising Sun Inn, Millfield, a heritage-listed former post office, inn, general store and residence, Millfield, New South Wales

UK
 Rising Sun, Carter Lane, London, a Grade II listed public house
 Rising Sun, Cloth Fair, London, a historic pub
 Rising Sun, Euston, London, a Grade II listed public house
 Rising Sun, Fitzrovia, London, a Grade II listed public house
 Rising Sun, Mill Hill, London, a Grade II listed public house

US
 Rising Sun Inn, Anne Arundel County, Maryland
 Rising Sun Tavern (North Haven, Connecticut)
 Rising Sun Tavern (Fredericksburg, Virginia)

Schools
 Rising Sun High School (Maryland), North East, Maryland
 Rising Sun High School (Indiana), Rising Sun, Indiana

Other uses
 Rising Sun (badge), an Australian Army badge
 Rising Sun (character), a comic book character and Japanese superhero from DC Comics
 Rising Sun (sculpture), a work by Adolph Alexander Weinman for the 1915 international exposition of San Francisco
 Rising Sun (yacht), owned by David Geffen
 Operation Rising Sun, a 1970s Cold War military intelligence program run by the Pakistani Directorate of Inter-Services Intelligence 
 Order of the Rising Sun, a Japanese honor
 Cagayan Rising Suns, a Philippines Basketball Association Developmental League team

See also
 Camp Rising Sun (New York), an international summer scholarship programme
 Camp Rising Sun (Connecticut), a camp for students with autism
 The House of the Rising Sun (disambiguation)
 Land of the Rising Sun (disambiguation)
 Rising Son (disambiguation)
 PS Rising Star, a 1818 ship
 Rising Sun Flag, a Japanese flag
 Risingsun, Ohio, a village 
 Sun-rising (hieroglyph), of Ancient Egyptian
 Rising sun lemma